Sarbas may refer to:
 Sarbas-e Olya
 Sarbas-e Sofla